The 1896 Missouri Tigers football team was an American football team that represented the University of Missouri as an independent during the 1896 college football season. In its first season under head coach Frank Patterson, the team compiled a 7–5 record.

Schedule

References

Missouri
Missouri Tigers football seasons
Missouri Tigers football